Anais Orsi is a climate scientist studying global warming through changes in polar ice.

Background 
Orsi received a Master's Degree in Engineering from the École Polytechnique in 2007. She then obtained a Master's Degree in Oceanography from the University of California, San Diego, and her PhD from the Scripps Institution of Oceanography. She travels to Antarctica to study internal weather patterns and uses them to predict future climate change.

Awards 
 2016 — L'Oréal-UNESCO For Women in Science Awards Rising Talent

References 

French climatologists
Women climatologists
Living people
Year of birth missing (living people)